Astro MAX was a personal video recorder (PVR) service for Astro launched in July 2006. It marked the first PVR system ever to be introduced in Malaysia, though LG's PVR-integrated Time Machine TV introduced later that year. Its successor is the Astro B.yond PVR.

Technical information
Astro MAX came to light in July 2006 as a combined digital satellite receiver/decoder and personal video recorder (PVR), as well as a rival for the upcoming LG's television integrated with a similar digital video recorder, the Time Machine TV. It allowed recording, pausing and instantly rewinding live TV, as well as a 30-second skip. The unit also had a 30-minute buffer which constantly records the currently watched program. Full integration with Astro's electronic programme guide enabled easy selection of programmes to be recorded. Additional features included the ability to record all audio tracks and all subtitle tracks on multiple language programming. Copies of programmes recorded would also be transferred to DVD or VHS tape. The system performed these functions using an internal hard drive inside the Astro MAX set top box. Programming was recorded without converting the DVB-S-compliant MPEG2 digital satellite stream, as such the recorded video is the same high quality as the broadcast feed.

The Astro MAX system was similar to TiVo. It was equipped with twin digital satellite tuners which allowed the recording of one programme while viewing another. However, the system was not be able to allow recording of two channels and programmes at the same time.

There was no service fee for the use of the Astro MAX system.

Production and reception
The reception of the system was generally poor, as the PVR starts and stops recording according to the time of day, based on the Electronic Program Guide. Unfortunately, especially on some channels, the shows do not start or finish on time. This results in the recorded show missing the beginning or the end. Also, the Electronic Program Guide is often wrong and reliability of the PVR units is not good. Many complaints were made regarding less sensitivity, lock-ups and reboots. These complaints are so overwhelming that in 2008, Astro discontinued the production of Astro MAX units altogether.

However, a new variant is currently being looked into, and will offer 100 hours of recording time as well as making full use of video-on-demand services. A pitch for its service was called, though no agencies were known to be invited. At the time, Astro's account is currently split between Y&R and Naga DDB. Sadly, this variant has not made it publicly, as the service has been terminated and closed down for ever.

The reasons behind the discontinuation of the Astro Max decoders and the eventual closure of the service are obviously there is something unsatisfactory or unfavourable about the service, such as piracy and copyright issues, and it could be profit related. Or, Astro is trying to keep it simple and keep costs low as possible, while remaining true to its name, only traditional television, despite being a MSC status company. The people who worked behind Astro Max has reassigned to other roles.

Astro announced they will stop supports for all existing Astro MAX customers on 10 October 2010. All existing Astro Max customers are offered to change to Astro B.yond PVR.

See also
 Astro B.yond
 Digital video recorder
 TiVo

References

External links
 Astro website

2006 establishments in Malaysia
Digital video recorders
Direct broadcast satellite services